Pingasa ultrata is a moth of the family Geometridae first described by Claude Herbulot in 1966. It is found on the Comoros in the Indian Ocean.

References

Moths described in 1966
Pseudoterpnini
Moths of the Comoros
Endemic fauna of the Comoros